Oberickelsheim is a municipality  in the district of Neustadt (Aisch)-Bad Windsheim in Bavaria in Germany.

Mayor
Michael Pfanzer was elected the new mayor in March 2014. He is the successor of Martin Hümmer.

References

Neustadt (Aisch)-Bad Windsheim